A leadership election was held within the Czech Social Democratic Party (ČSSD) on 25 March 1990. It was the first leadership election since the party's re-establishment and saw Jiří Horák defeat Rudolf Battěk. Battěk was supported by exiled politicians from the party, and wanted ČSSD to run in the 1990 parliamentary elections as part of the Civic Forum list, while Horák wanted it the party to run independently.

Results

Aftermath
Although Horák won, Battěk's wing of the party participated in 1990 elections on the Civic Forum list and won some seats. The ČSSD received only 4% of the vote and failed to cross the electoral threshold. Horák blamed Battěk's wing for the failure and Battěk and his supporters were expelled from the party.

References

Czech Social Democratic Party leadership elections
Social Democratic Party leadership election, 1990
Indirect elections
Czech Social Democratic Party leadership election
Czech Social Democratic Party leadership election